Renée Live is the second live album by Australian musician Renée Geyer. The album was recorded in December 1982 and released in April 1983 by Mushroom Records. The album peaked at number 80 on the Kent Music Report.

Track listing
Vinyl/ cassette (L 37975)
Side one
 "Intro"  (excerpt From "Be Yourself")  (Cameo) - 1.08
 "Look What You've Done" (Leo Nocentelli) - 4.06
 "Baby I've Been Missing You" (Chuck Jackson, Marvin Yancy) - 4.01
 "I Got News For You" (Jonathan Zwartz, Jane Lindsay) - 4.55
 "Say I Love You" (Eddy Grant) - 5.09
Side Two
 "Goin' Back"  (with Glenn Shorrock)  (Carole King, Gerry Goffin) - 3.54
 "You Don't Know What You Mean To Me" (with Venetta Fields)  (Eddie Floyd, Steve Cropper) - 3.05
 "Since I Fell for You" (Buddy Johnson) - 7.04
 "I Can Feel the Fire" (Ron Wood) - 4.55

Renée Geyer Band
 Renée Geyer - vocals
 Venetta Fields - vocals 
 Stuart Fraser - guitars
 Mal Logan - keyboards
 Chris Haig - bass guitar
 Steve Hopes - drums
 Geoff Oakes - saxophone, percussion
 Russell Smith - trumpet, flugle, percussion
 Sunil De Silva - percussion
 Trevor White - backing vocals
 Peter Chambers - backing vocals

Charts

References

Renée Geyer albums
Rock albums by Australian artists
1983 live albums
Live albums by Australian artists
Mushroom Records live albums